The Arboretum du Val d'Ainan (10 hectares) is a private arboretum located in Saint-Geoire-en-Valdaine, Isère, Rhône-Alpes, France. It is open primarily by appointment; a fee is charged.

The arboretum was established in 1993 and now contains nearly 350 species of trees and shrubs, organized into areas as follows: mountain, Mediterranean, Caucasus, Himalaya, China, Korea and Japan, and North America. The collection concentrates on autumn foliage, remarkable tree bark, oaks, and Pinaceae.

See also 
 List of botanical gardens in France

References 
 Arboretum du Val d'Ainan
 Photographs of the arboretum
 Rhône-Alpes Culture entry (French)
 Isère Tourisme description (French), page 17

Val d'Ainan, Arboretum du
Val d'Ainan, Arboretum du